Pravin Vittal Tarde is an Indian film director, actor, producer, and scriptwriter working in the Marathi Cinema best known for his Marathi films Deool Band, Mulshi Pattern, Sarsenapati Hambirrao.

Filmography

Films

Television

References

External links 
 
 Official Website 

Indian screenwriters
Place of birth missing (living people)
Living people
Marathi film directors
1974 births